Archeria eriocarpa is a species of shrub in the family Ericaceae.  It is endemic to Tasmania, Australia.

References

External links
Archeria eriocarpa at The Plant List
Archeria eriocarpa at the Australian Understory Network
Archeria eriocarpa at the Key to Tasmanian Plants

Epacridoideae
Flora of Tasmania
Taxa named by Joseph Dalton Hooker